Alejandro Arribas Garrido (born 1 May 1989) is a Spanish professional footballer who plays for Liga MX club Juárez as a centre-back.

He made 172 appearances in La Liga for Rayo Vallecano, Osasuna, Sevilla and Deportivo, also winning the Europa League with the third of those teams. Additionally, he played for UNAM and Juárez in Mexico's Liga MX.

Club career

Rayo Vallecano
Born in Madrid, Arribas began his career in the youth ranks of CF Rayo Majadahonda, being signed by neighbouring Rayo Vallecano in 2008. He spent almost two full seasons with the reserves, making his professional debut with CDA Navalcarnero in the second half of 2008–09 and going on to be regularly used in a relegation-ending campaign in Segunda División B.

Arribas helped Rayo B promote to the third tier in 2009–10, moving to the first team shortly after – in Segunda División – and being first choice (38 games out of 42) as the latter returned to La Liga after eight years. In the 2011–12 season he started in all of his 34 league appearances as the capital outskirts side narrowly avoided relegation, scoring in a 2–3 home loss against Athletic Bilbao on 28 January 2012.

Osasuna
In late June 2012, free agent Arribas signed a three-year contract with CA Osasuna. He was a regular for the Navarrese, appearing in 34 matches in his debut campaign.

Sevilla
On 27 July 2014, following Osasuna's relegation, Arribas agreed to a two-year deal with fellow league club Sevilla FC. He played 18 games in all competitions in his only season, including three in the UEFA Europa League group stage as his team won the competition for the second time in a row.

Deportivo
Arribas signed a four-year contract at Deportivo de La Coruña on 24 June 2015. His first league match for them took place on 30 August, when he featured the full 90 minutes in a 1–1 draw at Valencia CF, and he scored twice in his first year to help to a 15th-place finish.

UNAM
On 8 December 2017, after only three league appearances during the first part of the season as well as some run-ins with teammates, the 28-year-old Arribas moved abroad for the first time in his career and joined Club Universidad Nacional in the Mexican Liga MX.

He scored his only league goal on 4 February 2018, helping the hosts beat Tigres UANL 2–0.

Oviedo
On 30 July 2019, Arribas returned to Spain after agreeing to a three-year deal with Real Oviedo of the second division.

Personal life
In September 2019, while still an active professional, Arribas became the majority shareholder in first club Rayo Majadahonda's Sociedad Anónima Deportiva.

Club statistics

Honours
Sevilla
UEFA Europa League: 2014–15

References

External links

1989 births
Living people
Spanish footballers
Footballers from Madrid
Association football defenders
La Liga players
Segunda División players
Segunda División B players
Tercera División players
CF Rayo Majadahonda players
Rayo Vallecano B players
CDA Navalcarnero players
Rayo Vallecano players
CA Osasuna players
Sevilla FC players
Deportivo de La Coruña players
Real Oviedo players
Liga MX players
Club Universidad Nacional footballers
FC Juárez footballers
Spanish expatriate footballers
Expatriate footballers in Mexico
Spanish expatriate sportspeople in Mexico
Spanish football chairmen and investors